The 2005 Lexmark Indy 300 was the twelfth and penultimate round of the 2005 Bridgestone Presents the Champ Car World Series Powered by Ford season, held on 22 October 2005 on the Surfers Paradise Street Circuit, Queensland, Australia.  Sébastien Bourdais won the race and also clinched his second consecutive Champ Car championship. Oriol Servià earned his first and to date only pole position in his career.  The race also marked the final career podium for 1996 CART champion Jimmy Vasser, who finished third running for his co-owned team PKV Racing.

Qualifying results

Race

Caution flags

Notes

 New Race Lap Record Sébastien Bourdais 1:32.063
 New Race Record Sébastien Bourdais 1:39:26.671
 Average Speed 96.123 mph

Championship standings after the race

 Bold indicates the Season Champion.
Drivers' Championship standings

 Note: Only the top five positions are included.

External links
 Friday Qualifying Results
 Saturday Qualifying Results
 Race Results
 Weather information

Lexmark Indy 300
Lexmark Indy 300
Gold Coast Indy 300